The 2021–22 Iraq Division Two will be the 48th season of the Iraq Division Two, and it is the third tier in the Iraqi football league system since its establishment in 1974. The number of clubs in the league have varied throughout history for various reasons; in this season the number of clubs will be 112. The top four teams in the Final Qualifiers are promoted directly to the Iraq Division One, while the last eighteen teams in the Qualifiers within the Governorates will be relegated directly to the Iraq Division Three. The season is scheduled to start on 10 November 2021.

Al-Etisalat won the championship title after defeating Al-Hawija in the final match, with a big score of 5–0.

Teams 
The Iraq Division Two starts with 126 clubs and ends with four qualified clubs according to three rounds:

Qualifiers within the Governorates 
The 112 clubs are divided into 16 groups depending on the location, except for the groups of Dohuk and Erbil, each group representing the governorate to which these clubs belong and is located within its borders.

Qualifiers within the Territories 
The 27 qualified teams are divided into five groups according to the location, from each group, the first and second teams qualify directly to the final stage, with the exception of the seconds teams from the Northern, Western and Central Euphrates Groups, where they play among themselves so that one of the three teams qualifies for the final stage. For a total of eight qualified teams.

[a] Baban, Tuz and Al-Dujail withdrew from the league at this stage.

Final Qualifiers
The eight qualified teams have been divided into two groups, and the first two teams from each group will be promoted to Iraq Division One.

Group 1
<onlyinclude>

Group 2
<onlyinclude>

Final

References

External links
 Iraq Football Association

2021–22 in Iraqi football
Football leagues in Iraq
Third level football leagues in Asia